Chimera has been borne by at least two corvettes of the Italian Navy and may refer to:

 , a  launched in 1943
 , a  launched in 1990

Italian Navy ship names